The Undiscovered Country may refer to
Star Trek VI: The Undiscovered Country
The Undiscovered Country (album), an album by Destiny inspired by the film